Bendegúz Bence Bolla (born 22 November 1999) is a Hungarian professional footballer who plays as a right-back for Grasshopper Club Zürich, on loan from Wolverhampton Wanderers, and the Hungary national team. Bolla made his senior debut for Hungary in 2021 when he was named for Euro 2020.

Club career
On 17 July 2021, Bolla joined Premier League club Wolverhampton Wanderers on a permanent deal from Hungarian side Fehérvár. He was immediately loaned out to Grasshoppers of the Swiss Super League for the 2021–22 season.

On 25 July 2021, he debuted in the Swiss Super League on the first match day of the 2021–22 season against FC Basel at the Stadion Letzigrund, Zürich. Bolla was substituted in the 71st minute by Nikola Gjorgjev. On 31 July 2021, he played the entire match against BSC Young Boys at the Stadion Wankdorf, in Bern. On 11 September 2021, he supplied his first assist, leading to the 1-1 equalizer by Christián Herc against FC Luzern. He shot his first goal on 26 September 2021 in a 3-1 victory over FC Sion, where he took a direct shot off of Herc's corner kick to hammer it under the bar. One week later, he scored again in a 5-2 victory over FC St. Gallen. He has since supplied two more assists and has become a mainstay in the starting lineup, usually playing on the right wing. At the end of May 2022, after a successful season, he returned to his home club. In total, he played 30 league matches, of which he started in 29, shot four goals, and supplied three assists. As such, it is safe to say that he was instrumental in securing Grasshoppers' position in the top Swiss flight. After such a successful season, his loan was extended for another season.

On 27 June 2022, he was loaned to Grasshoppers for the 2022-23 Swiss Super League season. On 1 October 2022, he scored his first goal in the 2022-23 season against FC Zürich at the Letzigrund. Seven days later, on 8 October 2022, he scored his second goal in the 2022-23 season in a 4-4 draw against FC Sion. In an interview with Nemzeti Sport, he said that it was a good decision to stay in Switzerland because the coach remained the same and the core of the team was also preserved.

International career
On 1 June 2021, Bolla was included in the final 26-man squad to represent the Hungary national team at the rescheduled UEFA Euro 2020 tournament. He debuted for Hungary in a friendly 1–0 win over Cyprus on 4 June 2021.

Personal life
Bolla 's father is László Bolla, who is the co-founder of Főnix along with Zsolt Szoboszlai, father of Hungary national football team player Dominik Szoboszlai.

Career statistics

References

External links

Living people
1999 births
People from Székesfehérvár
Hungarian footballers
Hungary youth international footballers
Hungary under-21 international footballers
Hungary international footballers
Association football defenders
Fehérvár FC players
BFC Siófok players
Zalaegerszegi TE players
Nemzeti Bajnokság I players
Nemzeti Bajnokság II players
UEFA Euro 2020 players